Unsheltered is a 2018 novel by Barbara Kingsolver published by HarperCollins. It follows two families living in the same house at two separate time periods in Vineland, New Jersey.  The novel alternates between the 21st century and the 19th century, using the last words of one chapter as the title of the next one. One family lived in the house in the 1800s and the other family resides in the house in the aftermath of Hurricane Sandy.

Plot

Major characters 
21st century:
 Willa Knox – journalist
 Iano Tavoularis – PhD in anthropology, her husband
 Tig (Antigone) – Willa and Iano's daughter
 Zeke – Willa and Iano's son
 Nick – Iano's irascible father
 Dixie – the dog
 Helene – Zeke's girlfriend, who committed suicide
 Aldus (Dusty) – Zeke and Helene's infant son
 Athena, Lita, and Irini – Iano's sisters
 Christopher Hawk – museum Curator
 Jorge – Neighbor boy, Tig's boyfriend

19th century (some modelled on real persons):
 Thatcher Greenwood – BS in Biology
 Rose – his wife
 Mary Treat – neighbor (real-life naturalist, botanist, entomologist); next-door neighbor
 Polly – Rose's sister
 Aurelia – Rose's mother
 Selma – Mary's servant girl/botany assistant
 Captain Charles K. Landis – Vinland's founder, mayor and land agent
 Professor Cutler – principal of school where Thatcher teaches; toady to Landis
 Uri Carruth – editor of rival paper
 Charybdis & Scylla – dogs of the Greenwood family

Reception and awards 
The novel received mostly positive reviews from critics. Writing in the New York Times, Meg Wolitzer, says this book "lures us into" this story about a house and the two different families that occupy it  during two different periods of time. Ilana Masad states in her NPR review that by the end of the novel "Kingsolver doesn't give us solutions, but she reminds us to take comfort in one another when we can, and that hope is necessary even when all seems lost." Benjamin Evans' review in The Guardian notes, "Unlike the incompetent architect of the house in her latest book, Unsheltered, American novelist Barbara Kingsolver has proved herself a supreme craftsperson over the past three decades. She possesses a knack for ingenious metaphors that encapsulate the social questions at the heart of her stories."

References

External links 
 "Unsheltered" at Barbara Kingsolver's authorized website

2018 American novels
Novels set in New Jersey
Vineland, New Jersey
American historical novels
Novels set in the 19th century
HarperCollins books
Novels by Barbara Kingsolver